Streptomyces lunaelactis is a bacterium species from the genus of Streptomyces which has been isolated from moonmilk speleothem from a cave in Comblain-au-Pont in Belgium. Streptomyces lunaelactis produces ferroverdin A

See also 
 List of Streptomyces species

References

Further reading

External links
Type strain of Streptomyces lunaelactis at BacDive -  the Bacterial Diversity Metadatabase

lunaelactis
Bacteria described in 2015